Intus was a traditional pre-colonial Filipino alcoholic drink from the Visayas Islands and Mindanao. It was made by boiling sugarcane juice until it reduces to a thick syrup. It was then allowed to cool and mixed with the bark of the kabarawan tree (Neolitsea villosa) and fermented. The word intus (or initus) means "reduced" or "liquid thickened by boiling", from the Old Visayan verb itus ("to reduce"). Like the kabarawan drink, intus is extinct. The tradition was lost during the Spanish colonial period of the Philippines. Among the Lumad people of Mindanao, intus was flavored with langkawas (Alpinia galanga) or pal-la (Cordyline fruticosa) roots.

See also
Kabarawan
Basi
Palek

References

Fermented drinks
Philippine alcoholic drinks
Philippine cuisine